Zmutt (also spelled Z'mutt, Z'Mutt, Z-Mutt) is a small village in the municipality of Zermatt, Valais, Switzerland, situated at 1936 m in the Zmutt Valley (Zmuttal) west of Zermatt. The village chapel is dedicated to Saint Catherine of Alexandria, patroness of the Valais. The valley passes the northern slope of the Matterhorn and terminates in the Zmutt Glacier on the border to Italy's Aosta Valley.

This dam is fed by waters from the Zmutt, Bis, Schali, and Gorner Glacier.

External links
Z'mutt: Map and Pictures

Villages in Valais
Valleys of Switzerland
Dams in Switzerland
Glaciers of the Alps
Zermatt

fr:Zmutt